Chaetogastra rufipilis is a species of flowering plant in the family Melastomataceae, native to Mexico. It was first described by Diederich von Schlechtendal in 1839 as Rhexia rufipilis. One of its synonyms is Tibouchina rufipilis.

References

rufipilis
Flora of Mexico
Plants described in 1839